Anthony Hembrick (born February 22, 1966) is an American former professional boxer who competed from 1989 to 1996. He twice challenged for a world light-heavyweight title in 1992 and 1993. As an amateur, he was a member of the 1988 US Olympics team.

Amateur career
Hembrick is best known for never having had the opportunity to fight in the 1988 Olympics. Hembrick and his coach, Ken Adams, misinterpreted the fight schedule. Afterwards, they blamed the schedule for being too confusing. By the time Hembrick arrived at Chamshil Students' Gymnasium twelve minutes late, he had been disqualified and the match was being awarded to South Korean Ha Jong-ho.

Amateur Highlights
Hembrick was the 1986 and 1987 United States Amateur middleweight champion, while boxing for United States Army. He later was the U.S. Olympic representative at middleweight in 1988.

Professional career
Hembrick turned professional in 1989 and unsuccessfully challenged WBO light heavyweight title holder Leeonzer Barber, losing a split decision. Hembrick lost in his other title opportunity as well, in 1993 to IBF light heavyweight title holder Henry Maske.  He retired in 1996.

Professional boxing record

|-
|align="center" colspan=8|31 Wins (22 knockouts, 9 decisions), 8 Losses (5 knockouts, 3 decisions), 2 Draws 
|-
| align="center" style="border-style: none none solid solid; background: #e3e3e3"|Result
| align="center" style="border-style: none none solid solid; background: #e3e3e3"|Record
| align="center" style="border-style: none none solid solid; background: #e3e3e3"|Opponent
| align="center" style="border-style: none none solid solid; background: #e3e3e3"|Type
| align="center" style="border-style: none none solid solid; background: #e3e3e3"|Round
| align="center" style="border-style: none none solid solid; background: #e3e3e3"|Date
| align="center" style="border-style: none none solid solid; background: #e3e3e3"|Location
| align="center" style="border-style: none none solid solid; background: #e3e3e3"|Notes
|-align=center
|Loss
|31–8–2
|align=left| Richard Frazier
|KO
|8
|07/06/1996
|align=left| New York City, New York, U.S.
|align=left|
|-
| Draw
|31–7–2
|align=left| Terry McGroom
|PTS
|10
|23/04/1996
|align=left| Auburn Hills, Michigan, U.S.
|align=left|
|-
|Win
|31–7–1
|align=left| Mike Sedillo
|MD
|10
|31/03/1996
|align=left| Auburn Hills, Michigan, U.S.
|align=left|
|-
|Win
|30–7–1
|align=left| Richard Perry
|TKO
|5
|25/02/1996
|align=left| Nashville, Tennessee, U.S.
|align=left|
|-
|Loss
|29–7–1
|align=left| James Toney
|RTD
|5
|30/04/1995
|align=left| Paradise, Nevada, U.S.
|align=left|
|-
|Win
|29–6–1
|align=left| Rudy Nix
|TKO
|6
|25/01/1995
|align=left| Atlantic City, New Jersey, U.S.
|align=left|
|-
|Loss
|28–6–1
|align=left| Richard Frazier
|UD
|8
|17/12/1994
|align=left| Atlantic City, New Jersey, U.S.
|align=left|
|-
|Win
|28–5–1
|align=left| Tim St Clair
|TKO
|3
|20/09/1994
|align=left| Pensacola, Florida, U.S.
|align=left|
|-
|Loss
|27–5–1
|align=left| James Toney
|TKO
|7
|16/01/1994
|align=left| Bushkill, Pennsylvania, U.S.
|align=left|
|-
|Loss
|27–4–1
|align=left| Henry Maske
|UD
|12
|18/09/1993
|align=left|Düsseldorf, Germany
|align=left|
|-
|Win
|27–3–1
|align=left| John Foreman
|TKO
|6
|20/03/1993
|align=left| Düsseldorf, Germany
|align=left|
|-
|Win
|26–3–1
|align=left| Pat Alley
|TKO
|5
|26/12/1992
|align=left| Revere, Massachusetts, U.S.
|align=left|
|-
|Win
|25–3–1
|align=left| Ron Daniels
|TKO
|3
|21/10/1992
|align=left| Winchester, Nevada, U.S.
|align=left|
|-
|Win
|24–3–1
|align=left| Earl Butler
|TKO
|4
|03/09/1992
|align=left| San Bernardino, California, U.S.
|align=left|
|-
|Loss
|23–3–1
|align=left| Orlin Norris
|TKO
|8
|25/03/1992
|align=left| San Diego, California, U.S.
|align=left|
|-
|Loss
|23–2–1
|align=left| Leeonzer Barber
|SD
|12
|07/01/1992
|align=left| Auburn Hills, Michigan, U.S.
|align=left|
|-
|Win
|23–1–1
|align=left| Joe McKnight
|KO
|1
|17/12/1991
|align=left| Honolulu, Hawaii, U.S.
|align=left|
|-
|Win
|22–1–1
|align=left| Robert Johnson
|KO
|1
|15/11/1991
|align=left| Roanoke, Virginia, U.S.
|align=left|
|-
|Win
|21–1–1
|align=left| James Williamson
|TKO
|2
|17/09/1991
|align=left| Auburn Hills, Michigan, U.S.
|align=left|
|-
|Win
|20–1–1
|align=left| Larry Prather
|KO
|3
|25/06/1991
|align=left| Auburn Hills, Michigan, U.S.
|align=left|
|-
| Draw
|19–1–1
|align=left| Mike Sedillo
|PTS
|10
|20/05/1991
|align=left| Houston, Texas, U.S.
|align=left|
|-
|Win
|19–1
|align=left| James Mullins
|TKO
|1
|28/04/1991
|align=left| Raleigh, North Carolina, U.S.
|align=left|
|-
|Win
|18–1
|align=left| Rusty Rosenberger
|TKO
|2
|06/04/1991
|align=left| Honolulu, Hawaii, U.S.
|align=left|
|-
|Win
|17–1
|align=left| Keith McMurray
|KO
|4
|11/02/1991
|align=left| Inglewood, California, U.S.
|align=left|
|-
|Win
|16–1
|align=left| Israel Cole
|UD
|8
|28/01/1991
|align=left| Reseda, California, U.S.
|align=left|
|-
|Win
|15–1
|align=left| Leslie Stewart
|UD
|10
|09/11/1990
|align=left| Hollywood, Florida, U.S.
|align=left|
|-
|Loss
|14–1
|align=left| Booker T Word
|TKO
|1
|12/06/1990
|align=left| Fort Bragg, North Carolina, U.S.
|align=left|
|-
|Win
|14–0
|align=left| Lenzie Morgan
|UD
|8
|28/04/1990
|align=left| Atlantic City, New Jersey, U.S.
|align=left|
|-
|Win
|13–0
|align=left| Martin Amarillas
|TKO
|8
|12/03/1990
|align=left| Jakarta, Indonesia
|align=left|
|-
|Win
|12–0
|align=left| Keith McMurray
|UD
|8
|22/02/1990
|align=left| Phoenix, Arizona, U.S.
|align=left|
|-
|Win
|11–0
|align=left| Donald Stephens
|UD
|6
|02/02/1990
|align=left| Paradise, Nevada, U.S.
|align=left|
|-
|Win
|10–0
|align=left| Rocky Bentley
|TKO
|1
|29/11/1989
|align=left| Auburn Hills, Michigan, U.S.
|align=left|
|-
|Win
|9–0
|align=left| Matthew Brooks
|UD
|6
|21/11/1989
|align=left| Santa Monica, California, U.S.
|align=left|
|-
|Win
|8–0
|align=left| Manuel Murillo
|TKO
|2
|19/10/1989
|align=left| Atlantic City, New Jersey, U.S.
|align=left|
|-
|Win
|7–0 
|align=left| John Keys
|TKO
|3
|28/09/1989
|align=left| Lewiston, Maine, U.S.
|align=left|
|-
|Win
|6–0 
|align=left| Darryl Spain
|TKO
|4
|07/09/1989
|align=left| Auburn Hills, Michigan, U.S.
|align=left|
|-
|Win
|5–0 
|align=left| Charlie Dean Moore
|PTS
|6
|27/07/1989
|align=left| New York City, New York, U.S.
|align=left|
|-
|Win
|4–0 
|align=left| David Overton
|TKO
|2
|02/07/1989
|align=left| Fayetteville, North Carolina, U.S.
|align=left|
|-
|Win
|3–0 
|align=left| Wendell Everett
|TKO
|2
|23/06/1989
|align=left| Atlantic City, New Jersey, U.S.
|align=left|
|-
|Win
|2–0 
|align=left| Danny Wofford
|PTS
|6
|24/05/1989
|align=left| Concord, North Carolina, U.S.
|align=left|
|-
|Win
|1–0 
|align=left| Ron West
|TKO
|2
|22/04/1989
|align=left| Auburn Hills, Michigan, U.S.
|align=left|
|}

References

External links

1966 births
Living people
Boxers from Detroit
Winners of the United States Championship for amateur boxers
American male boxers
Middleweight boxers